Franklin County Courthouse is a historic county courthouse in Carnesville, Georgia, county seat of Franklin County, Georgia. It was designed in a Neoclassical architecture style by Walter Chamberlain and constructed in 1906. It was added to the National Register of Historic Places on September 18, 1980. It is located in Courthouse Square.

See also
National Register of Historic Places listings in Franklin County, Georgia

References

County courthouses in Georgia (U.S. state)
Courthouses on the National Register of Historic Places in Georgia (U.S. state)
Neoclassical architecture in Georgia (U.S. state)
Government buildings completed in 1906
Buildings and structures in Franklin County, Georgia
National Register of Historic Places in Franklin County, Georgia
1906 establishments in Georgia (U.S. state)